Etiqa is a leading insurer and takaful operator in ASEAN. A member of the Maybank Group, it offers a full range of life and general insurance policies, as well as family and general takaful plans via more than 10,000 agents, 46 branches, 17 offices, a bancassurance network comprising over 490 branches, cooperatives, brokers and online platforms across Malaysia, Singapore, Indonesia, Philippines and Cambodia. Etiqa is also the leading digital insurance/Takaful player in Malaysia with over 55% market share of online premium/contribution in the past three consecutive years. Etiqa is also the leading bank assurance player in Malaysia, a leader in Digital Life Insurance in Singapore and a leading Group Medical insurer in the Philippines.

Etiqa is composed of four main operating entities in Malaysia, namely, Etiqa General Insurance Berhad,  Etiqa Life Insurance Berhad, Etiqa General Takaful Berhad and Etiqa General Takaful Berhad, besides two smaller operating entities in Labuan and operating entities in Singapore, Indonesia, the Philippines and Cambodia.

History 
 Etiqa traces its root back to 2005 when Maybank Ageas (formerly known as Maybank Ageas), Maybank General Assurance, Maybank Life Assurance and Maybank Takaful merged with Malaysia National Insurance Berhad (MNI) and Takaful Nasional Sdn. Bhd.
 In 2007, the Etiqa name was launched
 In 2009, Etiqa Insurance Berhad opened its first branch in Singapore
 In 2014, Etiqa Insurance PTE LTD Singapore (EIPL) expanded its core business from general insurance to life insurance
 Also in 2014, Etiqa acquired shares in Asian Life and General Assurance in the Philippines (ALGA) which was renamed Etiqa Life and General Assurance Philippines (ELGAP) in 2016
 In 2017, Etiqa acquired the majority stake in PT Asuransi Asoka Mas (Asoka) which it has since renamed PT Asuransi Etiqa International Indonesia (EII) in 2020
 In 2018, in support of Bank Negara Malaysia's Islamic Financial Services Act 2013 and to better serve the stakeholders, Etiqa Malaysia became four main operating entities i.e. Etiqa General Insurance Berhad, Etiqa Life Insurance Berhad, Etiqa General Takaful Berhad and Etiqa Family Takaful Berhad
 In 2020, Etiqa began its operations in Cambodia under Etiqa General Insurance Cambodia and Etiqa Life Insurance Cambodia

Awards 
 Motordata Research Consortium Award 2021 - Fastest Estimating Claims Approval Time for Own Damaged Claims - Etiqa General Takaful Berhad
Motordata Research Consortium Award 2021 - Most Accurate Estimate to Claims Approval Amount - Etiqa General Takaful Berhad
Global Banking & Finance Awards 2020 - Best General Takaful Provider, Malaysia Category – Winner
 The Asset A Triple Islamic Finance Awards 2020 - Best Islamic Takaful Institution, General Takaful – Winner
 The Asset A Triple Islamic Finance Awards 2020 - Best Islamic Takaful Institution, Family Takaful – Winner
 The Asset Benchmark Research Awards 2020 - Top Investment House, Etiqa Insurance & Takaful (Rank 1)
 The Malaysian Takaful Association 2020 - Best Takaful Operator, Banca Takaful, Family Takaful Business Category – Winner
 The Malaysian Takaful Association 2020 - Best Takaful Operator, General Takaful Business – Winner
 The Malaysian Takaful Association 2020 - Best Takaful Operator, General Agency Takaful Business – Winner
 Islamic Finance News Awards 2020 - Best Takaful Company, General and Family Takaful – Winner
 Insurance Asia Awards 2020 - Millennial Insurance Initiative of the Year – Singapore
 Reader's Digest Quality Service Awards 2020 - Home and Contents Insurance – Gold Winner
 Global Brands Magazine Award 2019 - Best Customer-Centric Insurance Brand
 Insurance Asia Awards 2019 - Marketing Initiative of the Year – Singapore
 The Singapore 1000 - Singapore 1000 Company Emerging 2019
 Insurance Asia Awards 2020 - CSR Initiative of the Year - Philippines

References

Insurance companies of Malaysia
Takaful companies of Malaysia
Companies based in Kuala Lumpur
Financial services companies established in 2005
2005 establishments in Malaysia
Privately held companies of Malaysia
Malaysian brands